Bieke may refer to following rivers of North Rhine-Westphalia, Germany:
 Bieke (Bigge), tributary of the Bigge
 Bieke (Elpe), tributary of the Elpe
 Bieke (Glenne), right tributary of the Glenne that itself is a tributary of the Möhne
 Bieke (Kleine Henne), tributary of the Kleine Henne